Graham Keith Whyte (born 29 March 1952) was a Queensland cricketer in the 1970s and 1980s. He was primarily an off-spinner although also a useful lower-order batsman. During World Series Cricket Whyte was occasionally spoken of as a possible Test candidate.

Whyte made his first class debut in 1974–75. He took 6–65 against WA in 1976–77.

His best season was in 1977–78 when he took 25 wickets at 32.48. He did not play first class cricket from 1970 to 1983 but returned over the 1983–84 summer to take 20 wickets at 40.80. His last first class game was played in 1984–85.

References

External links
Graham Whyte at Cricinfo
Graham Whyte at CricketArchive

Cricketers from Queensland
1952 births
Living people
Australian cricketers
Queensland cricketers